Leucanthemopsis is a genus of flowering plants in the daisy family.

 Species
 Leucanthemopsis alpina (L.) Heywood - central + southern Europe from Spain to Ukraine
 Leucanthemopsis flaveola (Hoffmanns. & Link) Heywood - Spain, Portugal
 Leucanthemopsis longipectinata (Font Quer) Heywood - Morocco
 Leucanthemopsis pallida (Mill.) Heywood  - Spain
 Leucanthemopsis pallidaspathulifolia - Subbaetic Mountains in southern Spain
 Leucanthemopsis pectinata (L.) G.López & C.E.Jarvis - Morocco, Spain
 Leucanthemopsis pulverulenta (Lag.) Heywood - Spain, Portugal
 Leucanthemopsis trifurcatum (Desf.) Alavi - Morocco, Algeria, Tunisia, Libya

References

Anthemideae
Asteraceae genera